Nuno Filipe Rodrigues Silva (born 18 April 1979 in Vila Verde, Braga District), known as Reguila, is a Portuguese former professional footballer who played as a striker.

References

External links

1979 births
Living people
People from Vila Verde
Portuguese footballers
Association football forwards
Primeira Liga players
Liga Portugal 2 players
Segunda Divisão players
Merelinense F.C. players
C.D. Trofense players
Gondomar S.C. players
C.D. Santa Clara players
F.C. Famalicão players
Vilaverdense F.C. players
Sportspeople from Braga District